The Hendrikus DuBois House is located on Albany Post Road near the line between the towns of Gardiner and New Paltz in Ulster County, New York, United States, an area once known as Libertyville.

DuBois served as a captain in the Fourth Regiment of the Ulster County Militia during the American Revolutionary War. He built the house in 1775 on land his grandfather Louis, one of the original Huguenot settlers of the area, had bought from the Esopus Indians.

It was added to the National Register of Historic Places in 1982.

References

Houses on the National Register of Historic Places in New York (state)
Houses in Ulster County, New York
National Register of Historic Places in Ulster County, New York
Houses completed in 1775
Gardiner, New York